Pyotr Yefimovich Sorokin (born in 1889 in Saint Petersburg; died in 1942) was an association football player.

International career
Sorokin made his debut for the Russian Empire on July 14, 1912 in a friendly against Hungary.

External links
  Profile

1889 births
1942 deaths
Footballers from the Russian Empire

Association football forwards